Franco Mata (born 12 July 1979) is a Mozambican former professional tennis player.

Born in Maputo, Mata made an ATP Tour main draw appearance at the 2000 Estoril Open, partnering Angola's Nélson Almeida in the doubles. He played collegiate tennis in the United States for Florida Gulf Coast University and has represented Mozambique at the African Games. Since 2014 he has been a member of the Mozambique Davis Cup team, holding national records for most ties played and most wins.

References

External links
 
 
 

1979 births
Living people
Mozambican male tennis players
Sportspeople from Maputo
Florida Gulf Coast University alumni
College men's tennis players in the United States
African Games competitors for Mozambique
Florida Gulf Coast Eagles athletes